The 2019 Royal London One-Day Cup tournament was a limited overs cricket competition that formed part of the 2019 domestic cricket season in England and Wales. The tournament was won by Somerset, their first win in the tournament since 2001. Matches were contested over 50 overs per side and had List A cricket status. All eighteen first-class counties competed in the tournament, which due to the 2019 Cricket World Cup being hosted in England took place at the beginning of the English cricket season starting on 17 April 2019, with the final taking place just over a month later at Lord's on 25 May 2019. Hampshire were the defending champions.

Format

The competition featured two groups of nine teams, based on a rough North–South geographical split. Each team played eight matches during the group stage, playing every other member of their group once, with four matches at home and four away. The group stage took place from the middle of April to the end, taking place earlier than usual due to the 2019 Cricket World Cup taking place in England and Wales. The group winners progressed straight to the semi-finals and the second and third placed teams in each group played a play-off against a team from the other group with the winner progressing to one of the semi-final matches.

North Group

Teams

Table

Results

April

May

South Group

Teams

Table

Results

April

May

Knockout stage
The winner of each group progressed straight to the semi-finals with the second and third placed teams playing a play-off match against a team from the other group which made up the play-offs. The winner of each play-off played one of the group winners in the semi-finals. The final took place at Lord's on 25 May 2019.

Play-offs

Semi-finals

Final

Statistics

Highest score by a team

 — Source: ESPN Cricinfo

Lowest score by a team

 — Source: ESPN Cricinfo

Top score by an individual

 — Source: ESPN Cricinfo

Best bowling figures by an individual

 — Source: ESPN Cricinfo

Most runs

 — Source: ESPN Cricinfo

Most wickets

 — Source: ESPN Cricinfo

References

2019 in English cricket
Royal London One-Day Cup
Royal London One-Day Cup